1924 Finnish Figure Skating Championships were held in Helsinki on 17 February 1924.

Men's single skating 

Source:

Women's single skating 

Source:

Pair skating 

Source:

Girls' single skating 

Source:

Sources

References 

Finnish Figure Skating Championships
1924 in figure skating
1924 in Finnish sport
February 1924 sports events
1920s in Helsinki
Sports competitions in Helsinki